Lepidotoramus is a genus of beetles in the family Erotylidae.

The type species, and the only species currently placed within the genus, is L. grouvellei. It was described in 1997 by Richard A. B. Leschen of Landcare Research, from museum specimens that had been collected in tropical lowland Ecuador and Brazil.

References

Erotylidae